Gammarus insensibilis, the lagoon sand shrimp, is a species of amphipod crustacean found in coastal lagoons.

References

insensibilis
Crustaceans of the Atlantic Ocean
Crustaceans described in 1966